Basilica of Notre-Dame des Enfants (French: Basilique Notre-Dame des Enfants) is a minor basilica located in Châteauneuf-sur-Cher, France. The basilica is dedicated to Our Lady of the Children and is the seat of the Archbishop of Bourges. Built from 1869 until 1879, it is largely in the Neo-Gothic architectural style and was constructed at about the same time as Basilica of Notre-Dame de Fourvière.

History
It was built between 1869 and 1879 in grand Gothic style to replace the ruined 16th-century church. Father Ducros, the newly appointed Dean of Châteauneuf-sur-Cher, wrote to all the parishes asking the children for donations towards the building. The story goes that one little girl living in Semur-en-Brionnais wrote asking that the new church be named Our Lady of the Children and it is the only church in France to be called this.

In 1861, Father Jacques-Marie Ducros, priest of the Roman Catholic Archdiocese of Bourges, new parish priest, discovered a parish church in very poor condition. Eager to rebuild the building, the idea came to him to appeal to the generosity of children, throughout France. To his surprise, a young girl sends him her offering and her congratulations for having wanted the new shrine to be dedicated to Our Lady of the Children. The Blessed Virgin, invoked under this title, will take pleasure in filling childhood with the most abundant graces. The project was reoriented and donations flowed. The new church project would not have seen the light of day without the active collaboration of Brother Hariolf (Pierre Fayolle), director of the free school for boys of Châteauneuf-sur-Cher, of the congregation of de La Salle Brothers, passionate for architecture and construction. He supervised the construction works and brought this considerable site to completion.

Exterior
Is built on top of the hill and is an amazing structure of flying buttresses, pinnacles, spires, carving, statues, gargoyles. It is built from the local very pale tufa stone. The nave is very tall with lower roofs on the chancel and ambulatory. Entry is up steps to the west door which has statues everywhere, bishops, saints, martyrs. Vincent de Paul, Jean-Baptiste de La Salle, Anthony of Padua, James the Great, Aloysius Gonzaga, Germaine Cousin, Saint Osmund, Saint Lawrence, Louis IX of France, John Berchmans, Thérèse d'Avila, Stanislas Kostka, Saint Blaise.

Interior

Nave and choir
The inside of the church is huge. There are tall elegant fluted pillars with pointed arches and a small carved frieze at the top of the pillars. Above is arcading with round pillars, round arches and windows above. The ceiling is vaulted with roof bosses. At the back of the south aisle is a stone font. Three pillars support a very ornate carved spire with pinnacles above the font. The ambulatory is separated from the choir by pillars and pointed arches. It has three apses each with an altar. The chancel has a crucifix on the walls and a painted statue of the Virgin surrounded by children.

Under the windows in the aisles are massive carved Stations of the Cross in elaborate frames, each explaining where they are. The rest of the walls are covered with small Ex-voto. The Stations of the Cross is manufactured by International Artistic Union of Vaucouleurs.

Chapels 
The south apse has a fairly simple altar with Saint Anne and the young Mary. The central apse has a very ornate altar with carved figures on the base of adults bringing children to the Virgin. The retable has angels, spires and Biblical scenes including the raising of Jesus's daughter from the dead. Above the retable is a huge statue of the Virgin standing on a rock with young children lit up by light bulbs. The walls around the altar are covered with Merci plates. The altar in the north apse is again fairly plain with a statue of Saint Joseph and the young Jesus. The north chancel altar is carved stone with carvings of angels on the base and carved leaves around the top of the altar and along the shelf. There is a statue of Mary and Joseph on the host box.

Chapel of the Sacred Heart

Organ
There is a large organ in the choir. Its centenary organ dates back to 1889 and is the work of CAVAILLE-COLL, a renowned organ builder. Its sound system is admirable and concerts are organised every summer. It is now classified as a historical monument. The wooden choir stalls are fairly plain with misericords.

Stained glass
Basilica of Our Lady of the Children is especially noted for its 19th-century stained glass manufactured by Lucien-Léopold Lobin.

Grand Housteau and apse
The west front has a blind rose window on the arch over the central portals.

Stained Glass Windows (19th-century)

Stained Glass Windows (19th-century)

See also
 List of basilicas in France

References

External links

 Pop Culture.gouv.fr: Basilique Notre-Dame-des-Enfantsl
 Monumentum : Basilica of Notre-Dame des Enfants
 Structurae structures Basilique Notre-Dame des Enfants
 City of Châteauneuf-sur-Cher: Basilica of Notre-Dame des Enfants

Churches completed in 1879
Basilica churches in France
Churches in Cher (department)
Gothic Revival church buildings in France
Shrines to the Virgin Mary